Chacras de Dolores, which means "Ranches of Dolores", is a populated rural area almost entirely surrounding the city of Dolores in the Soriano Department of western Uruguay. Its northern limit is the river Río San Salvador.

Population
In 2011 Chacras de Dolores had a population of 1,961.
 
Source: Instituto Nacional de Estadística de Uruguay

References

External links
INE map of Dolores and Chacras de Dolores

Populated places in the Soriano Department